The 2011 IIHF Women's Challenge Cup of Asia was the 2nd Women's IIHF Challenge Cup of Asia, an annual international ice hockey tournament. It took place between 11 November, 14 November 2010 in Japan. The games were played in the Kirifuri Arena, Nikko. The Chinese team was the defending champion, having won the 2010 championship.

The tournament was won by Japan, who claimed the first title by defeating China 3–1 in the final. Japan's Yurie Adachi and Azusa Nakaoku were the tournament's leading scorer and goaltender in save percentage respectively.

Standings

Fixtures
All times local.

Gold medal game

Scoring leaders
List shows the top ten skaters sorted by points, then goals, assists, and the lower penalties in minutes.

Leading goaltenders

Only the top goaltenders, based on save percentage, who have played at least 40% of their team's minutes are included in this list.

References

External links
IIHF.com

2010 in Japanese sport
Asia
2011
2011
Women
Asian
November 2010 sports events in Japan